Brian David Johnson (born January 8, 1968) is an American professional baseball catcher who played in Major League Baseball for the San Diego Padres, Detroit Tigers, San Francisco Giants, Cincinnati Reds, Kansas City Royals, and Los Angeles Dodgers from 1994 to 2001. Prior to his professional career he attended Stanford University and played for the Stanford Cardinal baseball and football teams.

Early life
Johnson attended Skyline High School in Oakland, California, from 1983 to 1986, where he was a three-sport varsity letterman. As a catcher and pitcher for the Titans, Johnson tied one national record and broke six state records while being selected as an All-American. Johnson was the starting quarterback during all three of his years at Skyline.

In addition, he was the backup to Gary Payton on Skyline's varsity basketball team. Johnson was named the California Athlete of the Year by Cal-Hi Sports three times. Brian was also the bat boy and later played for the Oakland Horsehide softball club during the 1980s. Johnson projected to be a first-round draft pick after his senior year (1986). A week prior to the draft, he notified each team that he would not sign if drafted as he wanted to pursue his dream of playing two-Division I sports - while earning his degree on-time in four years. The Montreal Expos selected him in the 30th round of the 1986 MLB draft.

Career at Stanford University
Johnson earned a full scholarship to play quarterback for Stanford University. He was the starting quarterback during parts of his first 3 seasons. Johnson also played for the Cardinal's baseball team where he played seven different positions (all but catcher and second base) helping the team win two College World Series championships.

Major League Baseball career
After his junior year at Stanford, Johnson was drafted by the New York Yankees in the 16th round (413th overall) of the 1989 MLB draft to play third base. Although Johnson hadn't played catcher since high school, that was the position he was destined for during his professional baseball career. Johnson played for six different ballclubs during his career: the San Diego Padres (-), Detroit Tigers, San Francisco Giants (-), Cincinnati Reds, Kansas City Royals and Los Angeles Dodgers. He made his Major League Baseball debut on April 4, 1994, and played his final game on September 21, 2001.

On September 18, 1997, when he hit a home run in the bottom of the 12th inning against the Los Angeles Dodgers to move the San Francisco Giants into a tie with the Dodgers for first place. The Giants won the National League West.

References

External links

The Pride of two cities

1968 births
Living people
Albany-Colonie Yankees players
Baseball players from Oakland, California
Players of American football from Oakland, California
Cincinnati Reds players
Columbus Clippers players
Detroit Tigers players
Fort Lauderdale Yankees players
Fresno Grizzlies players
Greensboro Hornets players
Gulf Coast Dodgers players
Gulf Coast Yankees players
Indianapolis Indians players
Indios de Mayagüez players
Kansas City Royals players
Las Vegas 51s players
Las Vegas Stars (baseball) players
Los Angeles Dodgers players
Major League Baseball catchers
Memphis Redbirds players
San Diego Padres players
San Francisco Giants players
Stanford Cardinal baseball players
Stanford Cardinal football players
Toledo Mud Hens players
Wichita Wranglers players
Skyline High School (Oakland, California) alumni